Gliese 208 (Gj 208) is a red dwarf star with an apparent magnitude of 8.9.  It is 37 light years away in the constellation of Orion. It is an extremely wide binary with 2MASS J0536+1117, an M4 star 2.6 arcminutes away (at least 0.028 light years)

The spectral type of Gj 208 has variously been described between K6 and M1. Two of the most recent observations give a statistically calculated spectral type of K7.9 or a more traditional classification of M0.0 Ve. It is a cool dwarf star and probably a spectroscopic binary.

Calculations from 2010 suggest that this star passed as close as 1.537 parsecs (5.0 light-years) from the Sun about 500,000 years ago.

GJ 208 is an RS Canum Venaticorum variable, close binary systems which show small amplitude brightness changes caused by chromospheric activity.  Its visual magnitude varies by about a quarter magnitude with a period of 12.285 days.

References

External links 
Wikisky image of HD 245409 (Gliese 208)

BD+11 0878
245409
026335
0208
K-type main-sequence stars
Orion (constellation)
Orionis, V2689
RS Canum Venaticorum variables
Emission-line stars
TIC objects